Krasnaya Gorka is a rural locality (a village) in Ziriklinsky Selsoviet, Bizhbulyaksky District, Bashkortostan, Russia. The population was 2 as of 2010. There are 2 streets.

Geography 
Krasnaya Gorka is located 26 km west of Bizhbulyak (the district's administrative centre) by road. Lysogorka is the nearest rural locality.

References 

Rural localities in Bizhbulyaksky District